Passport Husband is a 1938 American comedy film directed by James Tinling and written by Karen DeWolf and Robert Chapin. The film stars Stuart Erwin, Pauline Moore, Douglas Fowley, Joan Woodbury, Robert Lowery and Harold Huber. The film was released on July 15, 1938, by 20th Century Fox.

Plot
Conchita Montez is a beauty from South Africa, but is being pursued by some gangsters and in risk of getting deported, so she makes the moves on Henry, a waiter who's in love with her and quickly marries him.

Cast     
Stuart Erwin as Henry Cabot
Pauline Moore as Mary Jane Clayton
Douglas Fowley as Tiger Martin
Joan Woodbury as Conchita Montez
Robert Lowery as Ted Markson
Harold Huber as Blackie Bennet
Edward Brophy as Spike
Paul McVey as H.C. Walton
Lon Chaney Jr. as Bull
Joe Sawyer as Duke Selton

References

External links
 

1938 films
20th Century Fox films
American comedy films
1938 comedy films
Films directed by James Tinling
American black-and-white films
1930s English-language films
1930s American films